Dicentra pauciflora is a species of flowering plant in Dicentra, the genus containing the bleeding-hearts. Its common names include shorthorn steer's head and few-flowered bleeding-heart. This perennial wildflower is native to the US states of Oregon and California, where it grows high in the mountains in gravelly soils. This is a short bleeding-heart, approaching 10 centimeters in maximum height. From a rhizome beneath the soil it extends several erect petioles, each holding a leaf divided into leaflets which are each divided into smooth, fingerlike lobes. It also erects a thin stem which is topped with an inflorescence of one to three nodding flowers. Each flower is a shade of pink or purple to white, with two curving outer petals flexed back against the flower, and inner petals extended straight outward. The fruit is a capsule just over a centimeter long.
The specific epithet pauciflora, refers to the Latin term for 'few flowered'.

References

External links
Jepson Manual Treatment
Flora of North America Profile — map
Photo gallery

pauciflora
Flora of California
Flora of Oregon
Flora without expected TNC conservation status